Echinocystitoida were an order of extinct sea urchin in the subclass Perischoechinoidea.

References
Answers.com